The South Fork Stanislaus River is a major tributary of the Stanislaus River in Tuolumne County, California. The river flows for  through rugged alpine and foothill areas of the Sierra Nevada.

The river begins in Hay Meadow in the Emigrant Wilderness of the Stanislaus National Forest. It flows generally southwest, past Pinecrest, Cold Springs and Long Barn, then descends west through a canyon to the New Melones Lake reservoir where it meets the Stanislaus River.

There are two dams on the South Fork: Strawberry Dam, which forms Pinecrest Lake, and Lyons Dam, impounding Lyons Reservoir, which provides municipal water supply to the Twain Harte area. Strawberry Dam is part of the Spring-Gap Stanislaus Hydroelectric Project, which uses water from the South Fork and Middle Forks of the Stanislaus River to generate power.

See also
List of rivers of California

References

Rivers of Tuolumne County, California